The Dash 4 Cash is a series of races in the NASCAR Xfinity Series. Since its inception in 2009, the program has undergone many changes, most notably the addition of heat races in 2016.

2009–10: Inception
In order to drum up interest in its second-tier series, NASCAR made the Dash 4 Cash before the 2009 season. The original format included four races where all series regulars not competing in the Sprint Cup Series full-time could compete to win a $25,000 bonus on top of their race winnings if they won. If a Sprint Cup regular won, the money went to the next Dash 4 Cash race until an eligible driver won. The original four tracks were Nashville Superspeedway, Memphis Motorsports Park, Iowa Speedway, and Kentucky Speedway.

2011–15: First overhaul
The first major changes were made in 2011, when the bonus purse was increased to $100,000. Another major change was that only the top four drivers in point eligible drivers in the previous race could be eligible for the next race, with the exception of the first race at Daytona International Speedway, for which the field was set by the top four drivers in Nationwide Series points after the Road America race. After the Daytona race, Dash 4 Cash races were held at Iowa Speedway, Richmond International Raceway, and Charlotte Motor Speedway. If any driver won all four races, Nationwide would give that driver an extra $600,000, totalling the bonuses at $1,000,000. The program received only minor changes over the next four years, like track changes. The program also expanded to include a parallel fan experience, with fans getting paired with eligible drivers. The fan paired with the driver who won the prize at that race (it changed each year) won a matching $100,000. When Xfinity took over as title sponsor in 2015, the schedule became more spread out, beginning earlier and ending later. Regan Smith created hype in 2015 when he won the first race at Charlotte, sparking speculation that he could win the $1 million bonus since the final race was at Darlington Raceway, where Smith's only Sprint Cup win took place. However, Smith did not win the million dollars.

2016: Second overhaul
Before the 2016 season, NASCAR announced sweeping changes for the program, including adding heat races to determine qualifiers. The top two series points eligible drivers from each of the two heats would compete for the bonus. Erik Jones won the first race under the new format.

2017–present
Prior to the start of the 2017 season, NASCAR unveiled a new race format that divided Cup and Xfinity races into three stages. The top-two Xfinity drivers in the first two stages would be Dash 4 Cash drivers for the four-driver final stage. The other two slots are determined by those who locked themselves into the main field. Phoenix International Raceway replaced Indianapolis as a Dash 4 Cash race. In addition, any Cup driver that has five or more years of Cup racing experience and not declaring to run for points in the Xfinity Series are banned to compete in Dash 4 Cash races. For 2018, the Phoenix date was taken away and replaced by the spring race at Talladega Superspeedway, making it the first year that all four events were run consecutively.  The format was changed where the top-four Xfinity drivers from the previous race would be eligible the next week for the money. Additionally, no driver running for NASCAR Cup Series points could participate in the Dash 4 Cash races. The Dash 4 Cash schedule remained the same for 2019.

For 2020, because of delays due to the COVID-19 pandemic, the Dash 4 Cash races started with qualifying at Bristol, then the four races were Atlanta, Homestead (Sunday), Talladega 1, and Pocono.

In 2021, the Dash 4 Cash schedule will consist of the first races at Martinsville, Talladega, and Darlington, with the single date at Dover concluding the event. The field for Martinsville will be determined by the results of the first Atlanta race.

For 2022, the Dash 4 Cash races started with qualifying at Circuit of the Americas, then the four races were Richmond, Martinsville, Talladega 1 and Dover.

Results

2009–2010

2011–2015

2016

2017–present

See also 
Triple Truck Challenge
NASCAR Xfinity Series

References

NASCAR trophies and awards
NASCAR Xfinity Series